Microcosmodes elegans is a species of ground beetles in the genus Microcosmodes.

References

External links 

Panagaeinae
Beetles described in 1826